DuWayne may refer to:
 DuWayne Bridges (born 1946), American politician
 Duwayne Brooks (born 1974), English politician
 DuWayne Deitz (1930–2018), American football player and coach
 Duwayne Dunham (born 1952), American film director
 Duwayne Ewart (born 1998), Canadian soccer player
 DuWayne Johnsrud (born 1943), American politician
 Duwayne Kerr (born 1987), Jamaican footballer
 Dial D. Ryder (Dial Duwayne Ryder; 1938–2011), American gunsmith